Major John Alexander Fraser GC MC and Bar (12 February 1896 – 29 October 1943) was a British colonial officer who was posthumously awarded the George Cross, the highest British (and Commonwealth) award for bravery out of combat, for his "magnificent conduct" and "outstanding courage" in resisting Japanese torture during the Second World War.

First World War
Born in Edinburgh in 1896, and educated at Edinburgh University, he was commissioned into the Royal Scots Fusiliers during the First World War. He served as a machine gun officer and won the Military Cross (MC) in 1916.  The MC was announced in the London Gazette on 20 October 1916, and the citation read:

He transferred to the Machine Gun Corps on 27 March 1916, was promoted lieutenant on 1 November 1916, and won a bar to his MC in 1917, gazetted 17 December 1917 (the citation was not published). He later commanded a machine gun company, with the acting rank of major, and was permitted to retain that rank when he was demobilized.

Second World War
Joining the Colonial Government of Hong Kong in October 1919 and having been called to the Bar in 1931, Fraser was an Assistant Attorney General when the Japanese invaded in 1941. Interned in the Civil Internment Camp in Stanley he was instrumental in organising escape plans and operated a radio in secret.  The suspicions of the Japanese were aroused and Fraser was arrested and severely tortured but refused to betray his companions.  The Japanese, unable to break his resistance, executed him, most likely by beheading, on 29 October 1943.  He is buried in Stanley Military Cemetery.

The full citation for his GC was published in a supplement to the London Gazette of 25 October 1946 and read:

References

British recipients of the George Cross
British Army personnel of World War I
Royal Scots Fusiliers officers
Machine Gun Corps officers
1896 births
1943 deaths
Military personnel from Edinburgh
Recipients of the Military Cross
People executed by Japan by firing squad
Scottish torture victims
Executed Scottish people
Executed British people
20th-century executions by Japan
Alumni of the University of Edinburgh
British military personnel killed in World War II
British World War II prisoners of war
World War II prisoners of war held by Japan
Burials at Stanley Military Cemetery